Eucephalus engelmannii is a North American species in the family Asteraceae known by the common name Engelmann's aster. It is native to the United States and Canada from Alberta and British Columbia to far northern California and Colorado.

E. engelmannii grows in mountain woods and meadows. It is a perennial herb growing from a woody caudex and sending a slender, branching, hairy stem to a maximum height near . The inflorescence holds several flower heads lined in keeled, pointed, hairy-edged phyllaries with purplish margins at the tips. The fruit is a hairy achene.

References

External links

Jepson Manual Treatment
Southwest Colorado Wildflowers

Astereae
Flora of North America
Plants described in 1871